The Eurasian Schools Debating Championships (ESDC) is an annual open English-language debating tournament for high school-level teams representing different countries. ESDC is open to national and school teams alike, depending on team cap.

The first edition was hosted by the Robert College Debate Society in Istanbul with 50 teams from 20 different countries.

Format

Eurasian Schools Debating Championship debates use a special format known as 'World Schools Style Debating' as most of the teams esteem the tournament as a preparation for WSDC. World Schools Style is a combination of the British Parliamentary and Australian formats. In each debate there are eight speeches delivered by two three-member teams (the Proposition and the Opposition). Each speaker delivers an eight-minute speech; then both teams deliver a "reply speech" lasting four minutes, with the last word being reserved for the Proposition. Between the end of the first and the beginning of the last minute of an eight-minute speech, the opposing party may offer "points of information". The speaker may refuse these, but should take at least one or two points during his or her speech.

Teams in ESDC debate eight rounds before "breaking" into octo-finals. After first round, teams are paired with each other with power pairing. Team with the same number of wins play against each other. If there are more than one teams on the same point, then teams are paired randomly. Top sixteen teams with highest number of wins and speaker points advance into single elimination octo-finals.

The Eurasian Schools Debating Council

During the inaugural ESDC, teams participating decided to form Eurasian Schools Debating Council which will govern the championships in a democratic manner. The formation of the charter is still in process.

Principles of the Eurasian Schools Debating Championships

Openness: ESDC will remain open to all teams of any formation as long as the space allows
Flexibility: ESDC will seek to govern itself in a non-bureaucratic way
Innovation: ESDC will seek to try novel ideas in debating

Past championships

Future championships

The 10th annual Eurasian Schools Debating Championship will be held in 2020.

References

External links
 
 

 

Debating competitions